A Fool and His Money is a lost 1920 American silent drama film directed by actor Robert Ellis and starring Eugene O'Brien. It was produced at Lewis J. Selznick studios and distributed by the Select Film Company.

The film was remade in 1925 with William Haines in O'Brien's role.

Cast
Eugene O'Brien as John B. Smart
Rubye De Remer as Aline
Emile La Croix as Mr. Schmick
Anne Brody as Mrs. Schmick
Finnstron Erics as Schmick's son
George Dowling as Schmicks's Elder Son
Frank Goldsmith as Dr. Hazzard
Wray Page as Mrs. Hazzard
Ned Hay as Billy Smith
Louise Prussing as Mrs. Smith
Arthur Housman as Count Tarnowsky
Charles Craig as Secretary Poopendyke
Jules Cowles as Benton
Elizabeth Garrison as Mrs. Titus

References

External links

 

Lantern slide(archived)

1920 films
American silent feature films
Films based on American novels
Lost American films
American black-and-white films
Silent American drama films
1920 drama films
Selznick Pictures films
1920s American films